Ohoven is a surname. Notable people with the surname include:

  (born 1946), German businessman
 Michael Ohoven (born 1974), German film producer and the founder and CEO of Infinity Media
 Ute Ohoven (born 1946), German UNESCO Special Ambassador